On Earth, and in Heaven is the eighth studio album by American singer Robin Thicke. The album was released on February 12, 2021, on Lucky Music and Empire.

Background
The single "That's What Love Can Do" reached number 1 on the Billboard Adult R&B Songs chart in 2019. On January 4, 2021, Thicke announced the upcoming release of his first full-length album in six years, following 2014's Paula. On Earth, and in Heaven includes songs Thicke wrote about his father, Alan Thicke, who died in 2016, and Andre Harrell, who died in 2020. Thicke explained the album's inspiration: "I feel like I'm finally the person I set out to be. I'm able to laugh at anything, which I've realized is the greatest superpower. I've fully embraced it, and nothing has been better for my soul. When I saw the phrase 'On Earth, and in Heaven', I realized that's what I'm singing about: the people who aren't here and the people who are here that made me who I am. This music is the sunshine coming out after the rain".

Track listing

Charts

References

2021 albums
Robin Thicke albums
Albums produced by Robin Thicke